First Utterance is the debut album of the progressive folk band Comus. It was released in 1971, with the opening song "Diana" being released as a single.

First Utterance was notable for its unique blend of progressive rock, folk, psychedelia, and elements of paganism and the macabre.  The overall thematic tone of the album is of vulnerable innocence facing abusive power, with songs dealing with such themes as necrophilia ("Drip Drip"), rape ("Diana", "Song to Comus"), and criticism surrounding electroconvulsive therapy ("The Prisoner").  These themes contrast starkly with the acoustic sound of the record, featuring acoustic guitar, violin, flute, and lyrical, almost Arcadian, female harmonies.

References to Comus by other bands and artists include Opeth, citing its lyrics in album and song titles and tattoos.  Experimental outfit Current 93 also covered "Diana" as the opening song on their 1997 LP Horsey.

Artwork
The cover artwork was drawn in ball point pen by Roger Wootton, lead singer and songwriter of the band.  The centerfold artwork was painted by guitarist Glenn Goring.

Critical reception

Reviews were favourable (the NME praised the album's "highly unusual but fascinating sound" and Time Out said "the overall effect is unique"), but sales were small and the band dissolved after the album's release. Early biographies of Comus said that a postal strike was one of the reasons that the album did poorly; however, none have provided an explanation for how a postal strike would have affected one particular album's sales.

The Wire included it on their 1998 list of "100 Records That Set The World On Fire [When No One Was Listening]", calling it "[f]olk rock at its most delirious, devilish, and dynamic." In 2014, FACT Magazine ranked it the 22nd best album of the 1970s, writing:

Based in Kent, Comus specialised in ingenious hokum: squawking tales of torture, pagan worship, zephyrs and psychotics. Unsurprisingly, they barely made a commercial ripple [...], but from the twanging fiddles and eldritch voices of ‘Diana’ onwards, First Utterance is both unapologetically weird and commendably self-assured. It’s extremely – and sometimes off-puttingly – mannered, but if you’re looking for the square root of the mid-2000s freak-folk explosion, this is it.

Track listing
All songs copyright Our Music Ltd.
"Diana" – 4:37 (Colin Pearson)
"The Herald" – 12:15 (Andy Hellaby, Glen Goring, Roger Wootton)
"Drip Drip" – 10:56 (Wootton)
"Song to Comus" – 7:31 (Wootton)
"The Bite" – 5:27 (Wootton)
"Bitten" – 2:16 (Hellaby, Pearson)
"The Prisoner" – 6:15 (Wootton)

Personnel
Roger Wootton – acoustic guitar, lead vocals
Glenn Goring – 6- and 12-string acoustic guitars, electric guitar, slide guitar, hand drums, backing vocals
Andy Hellaby – fender bass, slide bass, backing vocals
Colin Pearson – violin, viola
Rob Young – flute, oboe, hand drums
Bobbie Watson – lead and backing vocals, percussion

Production
Comus - arrangements
Barry Murray - producer
Jeff Calver - recording, engineer

References

External links
Hippy.com review
Psychedelicfolk.com review

"First Utterance" at discogs

1971 debut albums
Comus (band) albums